The Catalina 30 is a series of American sailboats, that were designed by Frank Butler and later by Gerry Douglas.

The Catalina 30 design was replaced in the company's line by the Catalina 309 in 2010.

Production
The boat was built by Catalina Yachts in the United States, but it is now out of production. During its production run from 1972 to 2008 in many versions, the design sold 6,430 boats, making it one of the most successful keelboat designs ever built.

Design
The Catalina 30 is a small recreational keelboat, built predominantly of fiberglass, with wood trim. It has a masthead sloop rig, an internally-mounted spade-type rudder and a fixed fin keel.

The design was initially fitted with a Japanese Yanmar diesel engine or a Universal 5411 or Universal Atomic 4 gasoline engine, but by the mid-1980s these had been replaced by the three-cylinder Universal M-25 diesel.

Variants
Catalina 30
This model was introduced in 1972 and was designed by Frank Butler. An optional tall rig has a mast about  taller. A bowsprit was optional.

Catalina 30 Mark II
This model was built between 1986-1991 and was designed by Gerry Douglas. Improvements include a T-shaped cockpit and a new deck and liner design. An optional tall rig has a mast about  taller.

Catalina 30 Mark III
This model was built between 1990-2008 and was designed by Gerry Douglas. Improvements include a re-designed cockpit, an open transom with a boarding and swimming platform, an updated galley and new topside windows. An optional tall rig has a mast about  taller. The boat has a PHRF racing average handicap of 186 with a high of 201 and low of 180.

American Sailboat Hall of Fame
The Catalina 30 was inducted into the now-defunct Sail America American Sailboat Hall of Fame in 2001. In honoring the design, the hall cited, "Designer and builder Frank Butler is in many ways a contradiction in terms. On the one hand he's an innovator and a risk taker. On the other, he takes those risks and uses those innovations to build boats for the common man; good solid boats that combine performance and comfort without costing an arm and a leg ... This design philosophy is perhaps best expressed in the Catalina 30, a racer-cruiser that set the trend for many of today's most successful lines and is itself still going strong after a production run of 25 years and more than 6,500 boats."

See also

List of sailing boat types

Related development
Catalina 309

Similar sailboats
Aloha 30
Alberg 30
Alberg Odyssey 30
Annie 30
Bahama 30
Bristol 29.9
Cal 9.2 
C&C 30
C&C 30 Redwing
CS 30
Grampian 30
Hunter 29.5
Hunter 30
Hunter 30T
Hunter 30-2
Hunter 306
J/30
Kirby 30
Leigh 30
Mirage 30
Mirage 30 SX
Nonsuch 30
O'Day 30
Pearson 303
S2 9.2
Santana 30/30
Seafarer 30
Southern Cross 28

References

External links

Keelboats
1970s sailboat type designs
Sailing yachts
Sailboat types built by Catalina Yachts
Sailboat type designs by Frank Butler
Sailboat type designs by Gerry Douglas